The 2022 COSAFA Women's Championship is the 10th edition of the COSAFA Women's Championship, a women's international football tournament for national teams organised by COSAFA, teams from Southern Africa. It takes place from 31 August to 11 September 2022 in South Africa.

Tanzania are the defending champion by having defeated Malawi 1–0 goals on 9 October 2021 in the final.

Participating nations

 Note: South Africa entered their B team, as their A team was involved in friendly matches against Brazil at the same time as the tournament.  Their matches thus do not count towards the FIFA ranking.

Did not enter

Squads

Venue
Matches will be held at the Nelson Mandela Bay Stadium, NMU Stadium and Wolfson Stadium in Port Elizabeth , South Africa.

Officials

Referees
 Itumeleng Methikga
 Mathabo Kolokotoane
 Assistant Referees
 Pélagie Rakotozafinoro
 Maneo Tau
 Mercy Zulu
 Roda Mondlane

Group stage

All matches were played at South Africa.
Times listed are UTC+02:00.

Group A

Group B

Group C

Ranking of runner-up teams

Knockout stage
In the knockout stage, extra-time and a penalty shoot-out will be used to decide the winner if necessary.

Bracket

Semi-finals

Third place match

Final

Goalscorers

References

2022
2022 in African football
2021–22 in South African soccer
2022 in South African women's sport
2021 in women's association football
International association football competitions hosted by South Africa
August 2022 sports events in Africa
September 2022 sports events in Africa